Villa Esplanada is a private housing estate developed by Sun Hung Kai Properties, China Resources and Cheung Kong on Tsing Yi Island in Hong Kong. It locates on the relocated oil depots on the former island Nga Ying Chau. It is close to Ching Wang Court, Tsing Yi station of MTR and Airport Express. The flats were sold in three phases.

It consists of ten blocks of high-rise buildings surrounded by a terrace of green plants and tree and adjacent to the seashore.

References

External links

Tsing Yi
Private housing estates in Hong Kong
China Resources
Sun Hung Kai Properties